The 2016 National Football League, known for sponsorship reasons as the Allianz National Football League, was the 85th staging of the National Football League (NFL), an annual Gaelic football tournament for the Gaelic Athletic Association county teams. Thirty-one Gaelic football county teams from the island of Ireland, plus London, competed. Kilkenny did not participate.

Setanta and TG4 provided live coverage of the league on Saturday nights and Sunday afternoons respectively. RTÉ Two broadcast a highlights programme, League Sunday, on Sunday evenings.

Dublin won their 12th title in total and their 4th in a row, defeating Kerry in the final on a score of 2-18 to 0-13.

Format

League structure
The 2016 National Football League consisted of four divisions of eight teams. Each team played every other team in its division once, usually four home and three away or three home and four away. Two points were awarded for a win and 1 for a draw.

Tie-breaker
If only two teams were level on league points:
 The team that won the head-to-head match was ranked first
 If this game was a draw, score difference (total scored minus total conceded in all games) was used to rank the teams
 If score difference was identical, total scored was used to rank the teams
 If still identical, a play-off was required
If three or more teams were level on points, score difference was used to rank the teams.

Finals, promotions and relegations

Division 1

The top four teams in Division 1 contest the National Football League semi-finals (first plays fourth and second plays third) with the winners progressing to the final. The bottom 2 teams are relegated to Division 2.

Division 2, Division 3 & Division 4

The top two teams in Divisions 2, 3 and 4 are promoted and contest the finals of their respective divisions. The bottom two teams in Divisions 2 and 3 are relegated.

Division 1

Table

Rounds 1 to 7

Division 1 Semi-Finals

Division 1 Final

Division 2

Table

Rounds 1 to 7

Division 2 Final

Division 3

Table

Rounds 1 to 7

Division 3 Final

Division 4

Table

Rounds 1 to 7

Division 4 Final

Statistics
All scores correct as of 25 April 2016

Scoring
 First goal of the league:
 Ryan McHugh for Donegal against Down (Div 1, Rd 1)
 Widest winning margin: 23 points
 Wexford 4-20 - 1-6 London (Div 4, Rd 3)
 Most goals in a match: 7
 Cork 3-10 - 4-25 Roscommon (Div 1, Rd 3)
 Most points in a match: 36
 Clare 2-17 - 1-19 Kildare (Div 3 Final)
 Most goals by one team in a match: 5
 Laois 1-22 - 5-11 Derry (Div 2, Rd 5)
 Highest aggregate score: 58 points
 Wexford 4-23 - 3-14 Wicklow (Div 4, Rd 5)
 Lowest aggregate score: 16 points
 Fermanagh 0-10 - 0-06 Meath (Div 2, Rd 2)
 Mayo 0-07 - 0-09 Dublin (Div 1, Rd 2)

Top scorers
Overall

Single game

References

External links
 Full Fixtures and Results 

 
National Football League
National Football League (Ireland) seasons